Lubików  is a village in the administrative district of Gmina Sanniki, within Gostynin County, Masovian Voivodeship, in east-central Poland. Its GPS coordinates are (19.806389, 52.300278). As of 2011, Lubików had a population of 120 people, of which 47.5% were women and 52.5% were men.

References

Villages in Gostynin County